Estradiol benzoate/estradiol valerate/norethisterone acetate/testosterone enanthate (EB/EV/NETA/TE), sold under the brand name Ablacton, is an injectable combination medication of estradiol benzoate (EB), an estrogen, estradiol valerate (EV), an estrogen, norethisterone acetate (NETA), a progestin, and testosterone enanthate (TE), an androgen/anabolic steroid, which has been used to suppress lactation in women. It contains 5 mg EB, 8 mg EV, 20 mg NETA, and 180 mg TE in oil solution and is provided in the form of ampoules. It is given as a single intramuscular injection following childbirth. The medication was manufactured by Schering and was previously marketed in Italy and Spain, but is no longer available.

See also
 List of combined sex-hormonal preparations § Estrogens, progestogens, and androgens

References

Abandoned drugs
Combined estrogen–progestogen–androgen formulations